Turcica is a genus of sea snails, marine gastropod mollusks in the family Eucyclidae.

Kano et al. (2009) have argued that Turcica belongs in the family Calliotropidae.

Description
The thin, subdiaphanous, imperforate shell has a conoidal shape. The whorls display transverse series of granules, the last rounded on the periphery. The thick columella is spirally twisted posteriorly, ending anteriorly in an obtuse, prominent point. The thin outer lip is simple and acute.

Distribution
The genus ranges on both shores of the Pacific, from California and Australia northward.

Species
According to the World Register of Marine Species (WoRMS) the following species are included within the genus Turcica :
 Turcica admirabilis Berry, 1969
 Turcica caffea (Gabb, 1865)
 Turcica imperialis A. Adams, 1854
 Turcica monilifera A. Adams, 1854
Species brought into synonymy
 Turcica (Perrinia) Adams, 1854: synonym of Perrinia H. Adams & A. Adams, 1854
 Turcica coreensis Pease, 1860: synonym of Turcica monilifera A. Adams, 1854
 Turcica helix Barnard, 1964: synonym of Herpetopoma helix (Barnard, 1964)
 Turcica instricta A. Adams 1864: synonym of Herpetopoma instrictum (Gould, 1849)
 Turcica konos Barnard, 1964: synonym of Perrinia konos (Barnard, 1964)
 Turcica salpinx Barnard, 1964: synonym of Clypeostoma salpinx (Barnard, 1964)
 Turcica stellata A. Adams, 1864: synonym of Perrinia stellata (A. Adams, 1864)
  † Turcica (Perrinia) waiwailevensis Ladd, 1982: synonym of Herpetopoma xeniolum (Melvill, 1918)

References

 
Eucyclidae
Gastropod genera